Henry Gilbert Smith (1802 – 1 April 1886) was an English-born Australian businessman, banker and politician, known as the "Father of Manly". He was the founder and developer of the Sydney suburb of Manly, where he built Fairlight House facing Delwood Beach. He was otherwise the chairman of the Commercial Banking Company of Sydney (now National Australia Bank), of which his nephew Thomas Smith had been deputy chairman.

Life and career

Smith was born in Northamptonshire, England to Thomas Smith and Frances Flesher. He migrated to Tasmania in 1827 and from there to Sydney, acquiring land on the Molonglo Plain. In 1839 he married Eleanor Whistler; he would later remarry Anne Margaret Thomas in 1856 and Anna Louisa Lloyd later than that. With his brothers Eustace Smith and Thomas Smith, he ran an importing and mercantile firm called Smith Bros in the early 1830s. He later became a director of the Commercial Banking Company of Sydney (now NAB. He was the brother of Thomas Smith and thereby the uncle of Australian politician and banker Thomas Whistler Smith, who was the deputy chairman and managing director of the Commercial Banking Company of Sydney. From 1856 to 1858 he was an appointed member of the New South Wales Legislative Council. Smith died at Brighton in England in 1886.

Legacy

Smith was the founder and developer of the Sydney suburb of Manly, where he built a home called Fairlight House facing Delwood Beach. It was demolished in 1939. A more lasting memorial was erected by Smith in 1856, in the form of a large statue of a kangaroo, located in Kangaroo Street, Manly.

References

1802 births
1886 deaths
Members of the New South Wales Legislative Council
19th-century Australian politicians